Robert Laurie or Lawrie MA (c.1606–1678) was a seventeenth-century Church of Scotland prelate. He was minister of Stirling before becoming, after the Restoration and the reinstitution of episcopal order in Scotland, Dean of Edinburgh.

Life

He was the son of Rev Joseph Laurie minister of Perth. He graduated MA from St Andrews University in 1636 and was licensed to preach by the Presbytery of Perth in 1641. In 1644 he was ordained at Trinity College Church in Edinburgh an in 1648 translated to the nearby Tron Kirk and to the High Kirk of St Giles in 1662.

In 1671 he became Bishop of Brechin, being consecrated at Holyrood House in Edinburgh on 14 July 1672. This was largely a nominal title was allowed to return to minister at Holy Trinity in 1674. 

He served as Bishop of Brechin until his death in March 1678. The historian Robert Keith referred to him as "a celebrated preacher, and a man of moderation".

Family

He married Catherine Drummond daughter of John Drummond of Colquhalzie. Their youngest daughter Joan Lawrie married Colin Mackenzie, granddaughter of George Mackenzie the Earl of Seaforth.

Notes

References

 

1678 deaths
Bishops of Brechin (Church of Scotland)
Year of birth unknown
Deans of Edinburgh
Members of the Parliament of Scotland 1669–1674
Scottish Restoration bishops